In 1841, Frederic Wright Unwin, a Sydney solicitor, purchased 5,120 acres or eight square miles of land approximately 10 km north-east of Melbourne, Victoria, Australia.  The land was purchased from the Crown for one pound an acre under the terms of the short-lived Special Survey regulations.

Unwin's Special Survey covered the area now bounded by the Yarra River (west), Koonung Creek (south), Church Rd (east) and  Templestowe Road/Foote St/Reynolds Rd (north).
It includes all of the Melbourne suburb of Bulleen, most of Templestowe Lower and Doncaster and the parts of Templestowe

References

History of Melbourne